The Giboney-Robertson-Stewart House is a historic house at 734 Hamilton Avenue in Wynne, Arkansas.  It is a two-story wood-frame structure with a cross-gable roof, erected in 1895 for W. A. and Ann Giboney.  It is one of the city's finest Queen Anne Victorians, and the only one two stories in height.  It has the irregular massing typical of the style, and a wraparound one-story porch supported by Tuscan columns.  Originally erected with a turret, that feature was removed sometime before the 1940s.  The house has been owned by members of the locally prominent Robertson family, who were judges and lawyers, and by Doctor T. J. Stewart, one of the area's first medical practitioners.

The house was listed on the National Register of Historic Places in 1998.

See also
National Register of Historic Places listings in Cross County, Arkansas

References

Houses on the National Register of Historic Places in Arkansas
Queen Anne architecture in Arkansas
Houses completed in 1895
Houses in Cross County, Arkansas
National Register of Historic Places in Cross County, Arkansas
Historic district contributing properties in Arkansas